Estácio de Albuquerque Coimbra (22 October 1872 – 9 November 1937) was a Brazilian lawyer and politician.

Biography
Coimbra was born in an engenho in Barreiros, Pernambuco, to farming Portuguese João Coimbra and Francisca de Albuquerque Belo Coimbra. He obtained a law degree at the Recife Law School in 1892, and became mayor of his birthplace in 1894. On 10 January 1895, he was elected a state deputy to the Legislative Assembly of Pernambuco, and was the youngest person to be elected to the Chamber of Deputies until 1989, being a federal deputy between 1900 and 1912. As the president of the Legislative Assembly of Pernambuco, he was designated Governor of Pernambuco in 1911 after resignation of the governor and the vice governor refuses to succeed him.

He get away from politics in 1912, only to return as deputy federal from 1915 to 1922. He also occupied the position of the Ministry of Agriculture during Epitácio Pessoa government (1919–1922) after becoming Vice President of Brazil in 1922. As Vice President, he also served as the President of the Senate. After leaving office in 1926, he took office of the state of Pernambuco, governing until the Brazilian Revolution of 1930. Then, he exiled himself in Lisbon along with his secretary Gilberto Freyre; after an amnesty he returned to Brazil in 1934, and died in Rio de Janeiro on 9 November 1937. His corpse was taken to Pernambuco and veiled at Palácio Joaquim Nabuco.

References

1872 births
1937 deaths
19th-century Brazilian lawyers
Brazilian people of Portuguese descent
Federal University of Pernambuco alumni
Governors of Pernambuco
Mayors of places in Brazil
Members of the Chamber of Deputies (Brazil) from Pernambuco
People from Pernambuco
Presidents of the Federal Senate (Brazil)
Vice presidents of Brazil
Members of the Legislative Assembly of Pernambuco
Brazilian exiles
Candidates for Vice President of Brazil